Aileen Maria Marty is an infectious disease expert and a professor at the FIU Herbert Wertheim College of Medicine.

Early life and education 
Born in Havana, Cuba, Marty moved to the United States, at the age of four years old, when her family left Cuba following the Cuban Revolution of 1959, moving first to Venezuela and then to the United States. She joined the United States Navy, and while in the Navy graduated from the University of Miami School of Medicine in 1982. In the Navy, Marty achieved the rank of Commander in the mid-1990s. She was appointed to the Homeland Defense Committee in 2001 by Admiral James A. Zimble. She was in the Navy for 25 years, and retired in 2003.

Career 
Marty is known for her work on infectious diseases, including Zika fever in Miami, Ebola, COVID-19, and monkeypox. While in the Navy she led training courses for civilians on weapons on how to respond to biological and chemical attacks, and studied old cases of anthrax at the Armed Forces Institute of Pathology.

As of 2022 Marty is co-editor-in-chief of the journal One Health.

Honors and awards 
In 2015, the Miami-Dade Parks and Recreation department honored Marty for her work on diseases such as Ebola and malaria. In September 2021, singer Gloria Estefan nominated Marty for Good Morning Americas "Inspiration List".

References

External links
Aileen Maria Marty, MD, FACP, biography at the FIU Herbert Wertheim College of Medicine

Living people
Florida International University faculty
University of Miami alumni
Female United States Navy personnel
Leonard M. Miller School of Medicine alumni
Naval War College alumni
Women physicians
Year of birth missing (living people)